The 1995–96 Football League season was the 97th completed season of The Football League. It was contested through three divisions, the First Division, Second Division and Third Division.

First Division 
The Division One promotion race was one of the most dramatic seen at this level in many years. 

Sunderland, who frequently topped the table after overcoming the previous leaders Millwall 6-0 at Roker Park in early December, clinched the Division One title in their first full season under the management of Peter Reid, five years after last playing among the elite in the old First Division. Derby County, who had been relegated alongside them that year, followed the Wearsiders into the Premier League as Division One runners-up, giving their new manager Jim Smith the fifth promotion of his managerial career. Crystal Palace finished third in the final table a season after relegation and a mere three months after their new manager Dave Bassett had taken over the club when they were in 16th place. Stoke City finished fourth as they mounted their first serious attempt to regain the top flight place which they had last held in 1985. Leicester City finished fifth after an erratic season, which had seen manager Mark McGhee defect to Wolves before Christmas to be succeeded by Martin O'Neill, who had been manager of Norwich City for just six months when he accepted the offer to take charge at Filbert Street. The final playoff place was occupied by Charlton Athletic, whose manager Alan Curbishley was now in sole charge after being joint manager alongside Steve Gritt for his first four seasons. The playoff final saw Crystal Palace take the lead in the first half before Garry Parker equalised for Leicester, and the game went into extra time. With just seconds remaining, new signing Steve Claridge clinched the winner for Leicester, who secured the third and final promotion place.

Things turned out very differently during the second half of the season for a number of clubs who had looked like promotion contenders in the first half of the campaign. West Bromwich Albion had been near the top of the table in October, before going on a 14-match winless run from which they picked up one point out of a possible 42 and dropped into the relegation zone. Improved form after ending their winless run in February lifted them up to a secure mid-table finish, but it was scant consolation for what might have been. Their local rivals Birmingham City had looked like promotion contenders halfway through the season, but faded away to finish 15th - a slump which cost manager Barry Fry his job after three seasons in charge, and sparked the return of legendary former player Trevor Francis to the club as manager. Norwich City had been in the promotion race when they lost manager Martin O'Neill to Leicester just before Christmas, but they were unable to sustain their promotion challenge under new manager Gary Megson, who was replaced at the end of the season by Mike Walker - the man who had turned them into Premier League title contenders and UEFA Cup competitors a few seasons earlier. Millwall had been top of Division One in early December when they were knocked off the top by a Sunderland side who beat them 6-0 at Roker Park. Manager Mick McCarthy left to take charge of the Republic of Ireland in February, and the slide down the table continued under his successor Jimmy Nicholl, culminating in relegation on the final day of the season. 

Joining Millwall in Division Two for 1996-97 were Luton Town and Watford, who had both spent most of the season in the bottom three despite mid-season managerial changes. Following the departure of David Pleat to Sheffield Wednesday in the summer of 1995, Luton had appointed coach Terry Westley as manager, only to replace him with the Bradford City manager Lennie Lawrence just before Christmas. Watford were bottom of the table when they sacked Glenn Roeder as manager in February, and then turned to Graham Taylor for his second spell in charge at Vicarage Road, three months after his resignation at Wolves. 

Wolves, one of the pre-season promotion favourites, failed to deliver the goods in the league and were heading towards the relegation zone when manager Graham Taylor resigned in November. The month-long search for a new manager ended with the appointment of Leicester City's Mark McGhee, who turned his back on a promotion challenge to help ensure that Wolves avoided relegation and prepared for a promotion push in 1996-97.

As well as managerial changes, relocation was another key theme of the 1995-96 campaign in Division One. Sunderland moved ahead with plans to leave Roker Park in favour of a new all-seater stadium at Monkwearmouth, due for completion in the summer of 1997. Having previously settled on revamping the Baseball Ground, Derby County chairman Lionel Pickering announced in February that the club would be relocating to Pride Park, with work beginning on the new stadium over the coming months and that the new stadium would be ready in time for the 1997-98 season. Stoke City, who had played at the Victoria Ground for almost 120 years, announced that they would be moving to a new 28,000-seater stadium at Trentham Lakes at the same time. Reading were pressing on with plans to relocate to a new 25,000-seater stadium by the end of the decade.

Play-offs

Results

Top scorers

Locations

Second Division 
Following back-to-back relegations, Swindon Town took a turn in the right direction by sealing the Division Two title with 92 points and securing a return to Division One in their first full season under manager Steve McMahon. They were joined in promotion by their local rivals Oxford United, who finished runners-up. The final promotion place was won by Bradford City, who won at Wembley for the first time in their history with a 2-0 triumph over Notts County in the playoff final. Crewe Alexandra were beaten in the semi-finals for a second successive season. Blackpool finished third and were also beaten in the playoff semi-finals, which was quickly followed by the dismissal of manager Sam Allardyce despite having come closer than any other Blackpool manager to regaining the second tier place which Blackpool had last held in 1978. 

Down at the bottom end of the table, Hull City dropped into the fourth tier for the first time in more than a decade, having won just five league games all season. Debt-ridden Brighton, whose chairman Bill Archer came under fire from fans over his plans to sell the Goldstone Ground and groundshare with another club, went down in 23rd place. Swansea City went down after being managed by four different men in the same season, with Liverpool legend Jan Molby taking over as player-manager before relegation was confirmed in hope of bringing some long-awaited success to the South Wales side. Carlisle United's disappointing return to the third tier of the English league ended in instant relegation as they occupied the fourth and final relegation place.

York City, who beat the drop at Carlisle's expense, made the headlines in the autumn with a shock 3-0 win over a Manchester United side, who finished the season as Premier League champions and FA Cup winners, in the first leg of the League Cup second round. This would prove to be the only time that the double winners lost a competitive game at home all season. York went on to eliminate their illustrious opponents from the competition, as a 3-1 United win at Bootham Crescent in the return leg was not enough to save Alex Ferguson's team from suffering a humiliating exit from the competition.

Play-offs

Results

Top scorers

Locations

Third Division 
Under a new owner and a new manager, Preston North End sealed promotion from Division Three as champions following two successive playoff failures. Gillingham, another club with a new owner and a new manager, sealed promotion as runners-up after seven seasons in the league's basement division. Bury clinched the final automatic promotion place following a mid-season change of manager from Mike Walsh to Stan Ternent. In the playoffs, Neil Warnock clinched his fourth promotion in seven seasons as manager, guiding Plymouth Argyle to promotion in his first full season in charge at Home Park with a 1-0 win over Darlington at Wembley. Hereford United and Colchester United were the losing semi-finalists in the playoffs.

A disastrous season for Torquay United saw the Devon club finish well adrift of 23rd placed Scarborough at the foot of the Division Three table, being confined to the bottom place with several games to spare, but their Football League status was saved when Stevenage Borough - whose Broadhall Way stadium did not meet Football League requirements - were crowned Conference champions. The club's future was then secured with a takeover by new chairman Mike Bateson, who replaced Eddie May with Kevin Hodges as the manager at Plainmoor. May's old club Cardiff City finished 22nd in the table - the lowest final position in the Ninian Park side's history. Fulham, another side once more familiar with the higher divisions of the league, finished a lowly 17th in the table, and prepared from a better campaign in 1996-97 by appointing veteran defender Micky Adams as player-manager following Ian Branfoot's move to the role of general manager.

As with a number of clubs in the higher divisions, relocation was on the cards at a number of Division Three clubs by this season. New Wigan Athletic owner Dave Whelan was looking to move the club away from their outdated home at Springfield Park to an all-seater stadium elsewhere, while Plymouth Argyle were considering leaving Home Park for a new 25,000-seat stadium at nearby Central Park. 

Two Division Three clubs were hit by major tragedy in the 1995-96 season. Wigan Athletic defender Mike Millett, who had just broken into the first team, was killed in a car crash the day before his 18th birthday. Alan Nicholls, the 22-year-old former Plymouth Argyle and England under-21 goalkeeper who was on loan with Conference side Stalybridge Celtic from Gillingham, was killed in a motorbike crash near Peterborough in November, along with the brother of former Gillingham player Scott Lindsey.

Play-offs

Results

Top scorers

Locations

References

 
English Football League seasons
2